Robert Francis George (born 16 December 1945) is an English television presenter and former professional darts player. He is widely recognised as one of the game's biggest personalities, known for his flamboyant entrances in which the "King of Darts" makes his way to the stage bedecked in jewellery, wearing a crown and cloak and holding a candelabra to the Queen song 'We Are the Champions'.

George won several leading major darts tournaments, he won the News of the World Darts Championship twice and appeared in two BDO Darts World Championship finals and was the first full-time exhibition player. 

Since 1998, George has also worked for the BBC as a co-presenter and promoter of the game in their coverage of darts tournaments.

Career
George took up darts at the age of 30, and quickly improved, winning the first tournament he entered and making his first appearance at the World Masters less than a year later. He has won several major tournaments, including the News of the World Championship in 1979 and 1986, the Butlins Grand Masters in 1979 and 1980, the North American Open in 1978 and the Nations Cup in 1980, as part of an England triples team with Tony Brown and John Lowe. And he was WDF Europe Cup champion in 1982 beating Eric Bristow in the final. George's News of the World victory in 1979 came without dropping a single leg, the only player to do so. Winning the 1979 final with a 100.20 average. George was the first player to get over 100 average on television.

George reached the final of the BDO World Darts Championship in 1980 at his first attempt, beating Dave Whitcombe, Leighton Rees and Cliff Lazarenko. His opponent in the final was Eric Bristow. George led the match 1–0, 2–1 and 3–2 in sets, before Bristow edged ahead 4–3. At 2–2 in legs in the eighth set, George missed an opportunity to take the match to a decider. On 66 with one dart in hand, he miscounted and hit treble-16 instead of treble-10, thus leaving himself the trickier double-9 instead of double-18. On his next throw for double-9, George hit single-9 with his first dart and then bust his score by hitting single-20, leaving Bristow with three darts for the championship, which he duly converted with his second dart to seal a 5–3 victory. 

George reached his second world final in 1994. After beating Russell Stewart and Martin Phillips, he broke his back when celebrating winning a set during his quarter final match against Kevin Kenny. George got through that match against Kenny by 4–2 in sets, having damaged his back when celebrating going 3–2 up. In his semi final match against Magnus Caris, George went two sets up, but then lost the next four sets and the opening two legs of the seventh set. When Caris missed a dart at double 18 to win the match, George responded by winning nine legs in a row to win the match 5–4 in sets. Competing in the final against doctor's advice, Wearing a steel corset, George lost 0–6 to John Part playing in extreme pain. 

A few weeks after that final, it was found that he had literally broken his back and had to have eight titanium screws inserted into the base of his spine just so that he could stand upright.

Since 1998, George has been a co-presenter and pundit on the BBC darts coverage, primarily of the BDO World Championship. He has also made several other television appearances, not all relating to darts. In 2002, he played himself in Sean Lock's sitcom 15 Storeys High, while in 2004, he starred in the comedy film One Man and His Dog and later followed in the footsteps of fellow professional darts player Andy Fordham by taking part in the ITV programme Celebrity Fit Club. In 2006, he appeared in a regular segment of Brainiac: Science Abuse series 4, in which he played darts in order to explode caravans. He was also a team captain in Showbiz Darts again alongside Fordham. In 2010, George performed Run DMC's Walk this Way on Let's Dance for Sport Relief with Tony O'Shea, Willie Thorne and Dennis Taylor. 

His colourful character has enabled George to be successful on the darts exhibition circuit, being introduced to it, and money races by his friend Tommy O'Regan. He became the game's first full-time exhibition player when he stopped playing regular tournaments in 1986. In 2009, he teamed up with Bristow and John Lowe to tour theatres around the UK and Ireland, appearing in a show named Legends of the Oche which was presented and hosted by comedian Duncan Norvelle. He appeared in a 2009 episode of BBC's Cash in the Attic. In January and February 2016, George appeared in the three-part BBC series The Real Marigold Hotel, which followed a group of celebrity senior citizens including Miriam Margolyes and Wayne Sleep on a journey to India. He also appeared on The Real Marigold on Tour, visiting Florida and Kyoto in 2016, Chengdu and Havana in 2017, and St. Petersburg in 2019.

In November 2017, George appeared on Gone to Pot: American Road Trip in which five celebrities (mainly older aged) go across California and Colorado to find out how cannabis can be used medicinally and how it would affect the UK if it was legalised.

Personal life
George was born in Manor Park, London. After leaving school, he had various jobs including as a nightclub bouncer and floor layer before taking up darts.

George lives with his wife and manager Marie and their sons Robert George and Richie George, at George Hall. The layout of the rooms has been designed to look like a dartboard. George is a keen fisherman, and within the George Hall grounds are well-stocked fishing lakes. George has two grandsons, Robert Jr (son of Robert) and Edward (son of Richie), who were born within 23 hours of each other in July 2013.

His son Richie is also a professional darts player. He reached the semi-final of the 2013 BDO World Darts Championship, losing to eventual champion Scott Waites.

George has worked as an ambassador for basic arithmetic, touring schools teaching children how darts can help with counting skills.

Quotes

 "Ton-eighties (or scores or trebles) for show and doubles for dough."
 "Throw where you're looking and look where you're throwing."
 "That's the way to do it, Luvverly jubberly."
 "May the darts be with you."
 "Putting the 'art' in 'darts'."
 (After being asked about a player's chances in a match) "It's like a computer, innit. If you press D, you play darts. If you press something else, you play like" (corpsing) "something else..."

Tournament wins
North American Open: 1978
News of the World Darts Championship: 1979, 1986
Butlins Grand Masters: 1979, 1980
WDF Europe Cup Singles: 1982
WDF Europe Cup Team: 1982

World Championship results

BDO

1980: Runner Up (lost to Eric Bristow 3–5)
1981: Quarter-finals (lost to Cliff Lazarenko 0–4)
1982: Semi-finals (lost to John Lowe 1–4)
1983: First round (lost to Tony Brown 0–2)
1984: First round (lost to Malcolm Davies 1–2)
1985: Second round (lost to Fred McMullan 1–3)
1986: First round (lost to Bob Anderson 0–3)
1987: First round (lost to John Lowe 0–3)
1993: Semi-finals (lost to John Lowe 3–5)
1994: Runner Up (lost to John Part 0–6)
1995: First round (lost to Ronnie Sharp 0–3)
1997: Second round (lost to Roland Scholten 0–3)
1998: Second round (lost to Sean Palfrey 2–3)
2000: Second round (lost to Ronnie Baxter 2–3)
2002: First round (lost to Raymond van Barneveld 1–3)

Career statistics

BDO major finals: 4 (2 titles, 2 runners-up)

WDF major finals: 1 (1 title)

Independent major finals: 2 (2 titles)

(W) Won; (F) finalist; (SF) semifinalist; (QF) quarterfinalist; (#R) rounds 6, 5, 4, 3, 2, 1; (RR) round-robin stage; (Prel.) Preliminary round; (DNQ) Did not qualify; (DNP) Did not participate; (NH) Not held

Performance timeline

References

External links

Bobby George's profile and stats on Darts Database
Kingdom of Bobby George

English darts players
British sports broadcasters
People from Manor Park, London
Sportspeople from Essex
1945 births
Living people
People educated at Reigate Grammar School
British Darts Organisation players
Darts people